Britos is a surname. Notable people with the surname include:

Marcela Britos (born 1985), Uruguayan middle-distance runner
Matías Britos (born 1988), Uruguayan footballer
Miguel Britos (born 1985), Uruguayan footballer
Sebastián Britos (born 1988), Uruguayan footballer

See also
Brito (disambiguation)